Cyperus chaetophyllus is a species of sedge that is native to southern parts of Somalia.

See also 
 List of Cyperus species

References 

chaetophyllus
Plants described in 1936
Flora of Somalia
Taxa named by Georg Kükenthal